Hellen Jemaiyo Kimutai (born 28 December 1977) is a Kenyan marathon runner.

She started out in cross country running and was fourth in the junior race at the 1993 IAAF World Cross Country Championships, taking the team gold medal with Kenya in a perfect score. She set a course record time of 1:05:28 hours to win the 20 Kilomètres de Paris in 2000.

Her personal best time is 2:25:53 hours, achieved in April 2003 winning the Hamburg Marathon. Her first senior international competition came at the 2005 World Championships in Athletics, where she finished ninth for Kenya in the marathon. She also won the 2005 Milan Marathon and 2007 Rock 'n' Roll San Diego Marathon. She represented Kenya in the marathon at the 2007 World Championships in Athletics but finished in 25th position.

She finished second at the 2009 Berlin Half Marathon. She took victory at the Vienna City Marathon, completing the course in a time of 2:31:08. She ran at the Frankfurt Marathon in October 2010, but only managed ninth place. Her two marathon outings of 2011 were a fifth-place finish at the Madrid Marathon and third place at the Baltimore Marathon. She won the Rome City Marathon in 2012.

She has four children with her husband Kenneth Kibet.

Achievements

References

External links

Marathoninfo profile
Rosa & Associati profile

1977 births
Living people
Kenyan female long-distance runners
Kenyan female marathon runners
Kenyan female cross country runners